Costea is a Romanian given name for males. It is also a quite common Romanian surname. It is a variant of the name Constantin.

Notable bearers
 Costea of Moldavia
 Costea, the alleged great-grandfather of John Hunyadi

As surname
 Florin Costea
 Mihai Costea
 Doru Romulus Costea
 Sergiu Costea

Romanian masculine given names
Romanian-language surnames